The Academy of Canadian Cinema and Television presents an annual award for Best Performance by an Actor in a Supporting Role to the best performance by a supporting actor in a Canadian film. The award was first presented in 1970 by the Canadian Film Awards, and was presented annually until 1978 with the exception of 1974 due to the cancellation of the awards that year.

From 1980 until 2012, the award was presented as part of the Genie Awards ceremony; since 2013, it has been presented as part of the new Canadian Screen Awards.

In August 2022, the Academy announced that it will discontinue its past practice of presenting gendered awards for film and television actors and actresses; beginning with the 11th Canadian Screen Awards in 2023, gender-neutral awards for Best Performance will be presented, with eight nominees per category instead of five. Supporting performances are now honoured with the Canadian Screen Award for Best Supporting Performance in a Film.

1970s

1980s

1990s

2000s

2010s

2020s

See also
Prix Iris for Best Supporting Actor

References

 
Film awards for supporting actor
Supporting actor